Kristjan Oja (born 8 August 1968) is an Estonian biathlete. He competed in the men's 20 km individual event at the 1992 Winter Olympics. His daughter is biathlete Regina Ermits.

References

External links
 

1968 births
Living people
Estonian male biathletes
Olympic biathletes of Estonia
Biathletes at the 1992 Winter Olympics
Sportspeople from Tallinn